Audie or Audy is a given name and a surname. Notable people with the name include:

Audie Bock (born 1946), American film scholar and politician who served in the California State Assembly from 1999 to 2000
Audie Cole (born 1989), American National Football League player
Audie Cornish, reporter with NPR's National Desk program
Adrienne Audie England (born 1967), American actress and professional photographer
Audie Murphy (1925–1971), American soldier in World War II, recipient of the Medal of Honor, and movie star
Audie Norris (born 1960), American retired National Basketball Association player
Audie Pitre (1970–1997), American bass guitarist
Audy Item, stage name of Indonesian singer Paula Allodya Item (born 1983)
Jean-Pierre Audy (born 1952), French politician
Julien Audy (born 1984), French rugby union player
Audie Desbrow (born 1957), American musician and drummer for Great White

See also
Audie Awards (or Audies), annually bestowed for outstanding audiobooks

English unisex given names

fr:Audie